Eduardo Asquerino (1826–1881) was a Spanish politician, journalist, author and poet. He was the brother of Eusebio Asquerino.

References

1826 births
1881 deaths
Spanish male dramatists and playwrights
19th-century Spanish politicians
19th-century Spanish journalists
Male journalists
Spanish male poets
19th-century Spanish poets
19th-century Spanish dramatists and playwrights
19th-century Spanish male writers